Chirai Dongri is a  village located in Mandla district of Madhya Pradesh state in India.

Population 
As per Population Census 2011, there are 455 families residing in the village, with population of 1,935 composed of 949 males and 986 females.

References

Villages in Mandla district